Omar Mansoor is a London-based fashion designer, best known for his couture occasion wear. He dresses British actresses, European aristocracy, and international royalty. He has been credited with re-introducing fusion clothing into modern fashion.

After attending the London College of Fashion, Mansoor was the first Pakistani to showcase at London Fashion Week, in 2008. OM made its appearance at Royal Ascot, Bahrain Fashion Week, Paris Fashion Week and Top Model UK. Mansoor's designs have been featured in publications including Vogue UK, the Huffington Post and the Financial Times.

Susanna Reid wore Omar Mansoor at the 2010 Academy Awards. The brand has also been worn by a number of actresses on the red carpet, including Miss United Kingdom Amy Guy.

Mansoor restyled the Cafe Royal staff uniform for 2008.

Mansoor's couture, bridal and custom-made garments, together with complementing accessories, can be found at Fulham Road, South Kensington, and online.

BBC did a short documentary on Mansoor's journey in 2015, and he won the TMUK achievement in women's wear award the same year.
He is part of a professional mentoring committee at the University of the Arts London and delivers lectures at various universities globally.

In October 2019 British Council invited Omar to attend 'Pakistani Diaspora Leaders Programme' to benefit the British-Pakistani Diaspora with his skills, talent and networks in order to increase their impact in Pakistan and the UK – and build bridges between the two.
Completing a decade of Royal Ascot annual collections, in 2020 Omar won horse racing magazine 'Eclipse' annual award for womenswear category.

References

External links
 omarmansoor.com

Year of birth missing (living people)
Living people
Pakistani emigrants to the United Kingdom
British fashion designers
Pakistani fashion designers